Jenny Harragon (born 1952) is a former Australian international lawn bowler.

Harragon made her Australian debut in 2001 and won the silver medal in the triples at the 2004 World Outdoor Bowls Championship.

She announced her international retirement in 2005.

References

Living people
1952 births
Australian female bowls players
People from Gympie
21st-century Australian women